is a Japanese actor known for his performance in several movies as a child and lately the award-winning TV drama Dr. Coto's Clinic. He notably played the part of Tora-san's little nephew in the "Otoko wa Tsurai yo" film series, and he appeared in Akira Kurosawa's "Rhapsody in August" and "Madadayo". He won the Japan Academy Award Best Actor in 2006 for "Always - Sunset on Third Street".

He was married to actress Yuki Uchida from 2002 to 2005.

Filmography

Film 
A Distant Cry from Spring (1980)
Otoko wa Tsurai yo (1981–2019) as Mitsuo Suwa
Final Take (1986) as Mitsuo
Poppoya (1999) as Hideo Sugiura
Juvenile (2000) as Yūsuke Sakamoto
The Hidden Blade (2004) as Samon Shimada
Miracle in Four Days (2005) as Keisuke Kisaragi
Always: Sunset on Third Street (2005) as Ryunosuke Chagawa
The Professor's Beloved Equation (2006) as Root (adult)
Always: Sunset on Third Street 2 (2007) as Ryūnosuke Chagawa
Always: Sunset on Third Street '64 (2012)
The Sea Is Watching (2012) 
The Little House (2014)
64: Part I (2016) as Kazuki Kōda
64: Part II (2016) as Kazuki Kōda
Fueled: The Man They Called Pirate (2016) as Tadashi Shinonome
Reminiscence (2017)
Kodomo Shokudō (2018)
Fukushima 50 (2020) as Takumi Maeda
The Brightest Roof in the Universe (2020)
In the Wake (2021)
Mirai eno Katachi (2021)
The Pass: Last Days of the Samurai (2022) as Takatoshi Iwamura
Riverside Mukolitta (2022)
Dr. Coto's Clinic 2022 (2022) as Dr. Kensuke Gotō
Winny (2023) as Toshirō Senba

Drama 
Kita no Kuni kara (1981 – 2002) as Jun Kuroita
Dr. Coto's Clinic (2003 – 2006) as Dr. Kensuke Gotō
The Policeman's Lineage (2009) as Tamio Anjō
All About My Siblings (2014) as Dr. Masaomi Shinjo
Akuma ga Kitarite Fue wo Fuku (2018) as Kosuke Kindaichi
Yell (2020) as Dr. Takeshi Nagata

Anime 
The Place Promised in Our Early Days (2004) as Hiroki Fujisawa
Osamu Tezuka's Buddha (2011) as Gautama Buddha

Endorsements 
 Nippon Telegraph and Telephone (1996)
 Suntory (1996–2007)
 Sharp Corporation (2004)
 Sundrug (2008)
 Yamasa (2007–2010)

References

External links and sources
 Official site
Profile on Hogacentral

Japanese male actors
Japanese male child actors
1970 births
Living people
People from Saitama (city)